A free parameter is a variable in a mathematical model which cannot be predicted precisely or constrained by the model and must be estimated experimentally or theoretically. A mathematical model, theory, or conjecture is more likely to be right and less likely to be the product of wishful thinking if it relies on few free parameters and is consistent with large amounts of data.

See also
 Decision variables
 Exogenous variables
 Random variables
 State variables

References

Philosophy of science
Scientific method
Ignorance